Samuel Hugh Dillin (June 9, 1914 – March 13, 2006), often referred to as S. Hugh Dillin, was a United States district judge of the United States District Court for the Southern District of Indiana.

Education and career

Born in Petersburg, Indiana, Dillin received an Artium Baccalaureus degree from Indiana University Bloomington in 1936 and a Bachelor of Laws from Indiana University Maurer School of Law in 1938. He was in private practice in Petersburg from 1938 to 1942. He was Secretary of the Public Service Commission of Indiana from 1942 to 1943. He served in the United States Army during World War II, from 1943 to 1946, achieving the rank of captain, and thereafter returned to private practice in Petersburg from 1946 to 1961. Dillin was also a member of the Indiana House of Representatives in 1937, 1939, 1941, and 1951, and was a member of the Indiana Senate from 1959 to 1961.

Federal judicial service

On September 14, 1961, Dillin was nominated by President John F. Kennedy to a new seat on the United States District Court for the Southern District of Indiana created by 75 Stat. 80. He was confirmed by the United States Senate on September 21, 1961, and received his commission on September 22, 1961. He served as Chief Judge from 1982 to 1984. He assumed senior status on March 31, 1993. Dillin served in that capacity until his death on March 13, 2006, in Cambridge, Massachusetts.

References

Sources
 

1914 births
2006 deaths
Judges of the United States District Court for the Southern District of Indiana
United States district court judges appointed by John F. Kennedy
20th-century American judges
Indiana University Maurer School of Law alumni
United States Army officers
People from Petersburg, Indiana